Uruguayan Mexicans are people born in Uruguay who live in Mexico, or Mexico-born people of Uruguayan descent.

Overview 
There are many Uruguay-born persons living in Mexico for a number of reasons. Both countries share the Spanish language, the historical origins of both nations is common (part of the Spanish Empire until the early 19th century), Mexico has a much bigger economy which attracted Uruguayans in search of opportunities, and, from the political point of view, during the civic-military dictatorship of Uruguay (1973-1985) ideological affinity made Mexico attractive as an exile destination for Uruguayans.

Uruguayans living in Mexico have their own institutions such as the Consultative Councils in Mexico City, Cancun, Puebla, and Toluca.

Notable people 
Past
Alejandro Zaffaroni (1923-2014), serial entrepreneur in the biotechnological field
Alfredo Zitarrosa (1936-1984), singer-songwriter
Present
Pietro Ameglio (born 1958 in Uruguay), civil rights and peace activist
Marcelo Buquet (born 1963 in Montevideo), actor and model
Nery Castillo (born 1984 in San Luis Potosí), footballer who started his career in Uruguay
Edgardo Codesal (born 1951 in Montevideo), football referee
Carlos Miloc (born 1932 in Montevideo), football coach 
Bárbara Mori (born 1978 in Montevideo), actress
Kenya Mori (born 1976 in Mexico City), actress
Rodrigo Plá (born 1968 in Montevideo), screenwriter and film director

See also

Mexico–Uruguay relations
Immigration to Mexico

References

Further reading 
 El exilio uruguayo en México

Ethnic groups in Mexico
 
Mexico